The PSA ES/L engine is a V6 petrol engine used in automotive applications. It was co-developed by the PSA Group (Peugeot and Citroën) and Renault to replace the outdated V6 PRV engine. It was introduced in 1997 with the Peugeot 406 Coupé. It is designed and manufactured by the company "Française de Mécanique" for PSA and Renault. In PSA, the engine is known as the ES engine, in Renaults, the engine is known as the L engine.

Unlike the PRV V6, which was a 90° engine because it was developed from a V8 project, the ES/L has a traditional 60° V-angle. It is constructed entirely in aluminum, and available only in DOHC 24-valve format. A 3.3 L version was initially planned as well, but did not see production due to decreasing demand in V6 petrol engines in Europe and Renault's switch to Nissan-sourced V6 after its alliance with the Japanese carmaker.

Initially, the ESL produced  in accordance with German and French insurance category limits in force at the time for engines under 3 litres. (The BMW 2.8 and Audi 2.8 produced the same figure circa ) In 2000, Porsche retuned the Peugeot/Citroën version of the engine introducing variable valve timing on the intake camshafts varying between 0 and 40 degrees, improving fuel consumption, low engine speed flexibility for the introduction of the Peugeot 607 and Citroën C5. This iteration, called ES9 J4S, can now achieve . This version was not used by Renault who was by then focusing on Nissan-developed V6.

In 2000, Tom Walkinshaw Racing created a competition version for use in the Renault Clio V6.

ES9/L7X 
The ES/L V6 has been used in a variety of cars from Citroën, Peugeot and Renault in the executive and luxury segments, namely the Citroën XM, Citroën Xantia, Citroën C5, Citroën C8 and Citroën C6; the Peugeot 406, 407, 605 and 607; and the Renault Laguna (Mk.I and II), Espace (Mk.III), Renault Avantime, Renault Safrane and Clio V6. It was also modified by Venturi into a  twin-turbo in the last of their Atlantique 300 Bi-turbo cars. The engines are built by Sodemo.

PSA 
With Renault shifting to the Nissan VQ engine 3.5 L V6, PSA became the sole user of the ES until 2010 when the requirements of Euro 5 emission regulations began; the Euro 4-only ES engine was no longer available in Europe and replaced by The turbocharged Straight-4 Prince engine.

Note: All 24-valve with catalytic converter

See also
 List of PSA engines
 List of Renault engines

References

Sources
 Guide des moteurs Peugeot Citroën (in French)
 Abu Dhabi Peugeot 407 launch details

Française de Mécanique engines
ES
L
V6 engines

Gasoline engines by model